Lieutenant Charles Esme Thornton Warren MBE (1912–1988) was a British Royal Navy submariner of World War II. One of the first Allied "human torpedo charioteers", practising methods of clandestine attack on enemy harbours and ships, he was later a bestselling author.

Early life 
Born at The Den, Rose Walk in Purley on 11 January 1912 to wealthy middle-class parents and the eldest of seven siblings, 'Jim' Warren was educated at Wykeham House School, Worthing and Bedford School (1926-1929). On leaving he spent a year with the New Zealand Shipping Company.

Royal Navy 1931-1946 
On 22 June 1931 he joined the Royal Navy as an Able Seaman Stoker, becoming the first ex public schoolboy to enlist as a Stoker and a determination to work his way towards a commission.

He entered the Royal Naval Barracks at Chatham for general and technical training where he hoped to achieve the New Entry Medal with a recommendation for early advancement. He subsequently joined seven hundred Stokers on the Battle Cruiser HMS Repulse which he later referred to as 'Jungle life on the broadside mess decks'. As one can imagine, a privately educated Stoker was unique amongst the occasionally violent atmosphere of the Lower Deck. However, having been aggressively goaded by a shipmate, he promptly laid him out, immediately gaining the respect of his peers and instantly putting an end to any further provocation.

In 1932 he returned to Chatham and participated in the Higher Education Test, deemed essential for promotion. He re-joined HMS Repulse in the Spring and volunteered for target towing on St Cyrus, later joining HMS Renown as 'writer' to the Squadron Engineer, a Captain who proposed him for early advancement and sent him back again to Chatham after the Spring 1934 cruise.

In spite of achieving 95% in the examinations under the Selborne-Fisher scheme, instead of receiving a commission, the Engineer Commander refused to recommend Warren because he did not agree with promotions from the Lower Deck. In an almost unprecedented move the Admiral of the Nore, Vice Admiral Sir Hugh Tweedie, although refusing to overrule the decision, granted Warren a free choice to join any ship he desired and was taken aback when he volunteered for the Submarine Service.

Submarine 1934-1946 
He joined the submarine HMS Rover in 1934 for her refit in Devonport and in March 1935 embarked on her for the China station via Gibraltar and Malta, where they picked up two more 'R' Class boats, HMS Regent and HMS Regulus and sailed on via Suez, Aden and Colombo where he spent four days with a tea planter cousin. In June via Penang and Singapore he arrived Hong Kong. In 1935 whilst on board HMS Otus at Shangai, he survived a serious engine explosion, eventually leaving Otus after eighteen months with promotion to Leading Stoker.

It was a happy period, the Otus crew was the best with which he had served, they visited the Chinese ports of Shanghai, Chefoo, Tsingtao and the R.N. Summer base at Wei Hai Wei. He represented both The Colony and R.N. Rugby teams, playing against touring sides from New Zealand and Japan. In June 1937 he volunteered to join HMS Oswald on its three-month voyage home. A period of Foreign Service leave was taken before being placed on standby for HMS Undine, the first of the 'U' Class submarines at Barrow in Furness.

After a spell training Royal Fleet reserves on Oswald and Osiris in 1939 he joined Lieutenant Commander Sladen on Oswald, patrolling the North Sea and Malta.

World War II 
At the onset of war in 1939 Warren was serving with Oswald and still undertaking patrols from Aberdeen to Malta and whilst in Malta in 1940, bored and in search of action, Warren volunteered for 'A Hazardous Operation' which entailed masquerading as a Merchant Service Fireman and Trimmer, complete with false passport, civilian clothes and a beard.

'The following month, myself and two other volunteers from HMS Oswald, arrived at the St Angelo barracks undertaking all sorts of drills under the auspices of a Royal Marine Sergeant who at all times symbolised the very highest traditions of his Corps, in spite of several attempts on his life by misdirected grenades and revolvers which were received with the utmost politeness! Personally, I considered those days spent using explosives were the most dangerous of my life and hardly in keeping with traditional engine room pastimes.

Together with our false passports we were all given £10 with which to buy civilian clothes although as we had no idea of where we were going, it was hard to choose appropriate dress. I got myself a pair of flannel trousers, a couple of overall shirts, a very used jacket and a bowler hat! I managed to save three pounds and purchased an old pair of boots.

Our paperwork was ridiculously full of errors, my name was presented differently on my passport to my Certificate of Discharge and if questioned I could not have satisfactorily answered any questions as to my false occupation and my 'identity disc' was not around my neck but strapped to my leg! The whole operation was too clean, we were too well clothed and turned out not to arouse suspicion in an impoverished environment replete with German spies.'

The plan was to arrive at Sulina, a small port on the Danube delta, infiltrate further up the river into neutral Romania and blow up several captured barges full of cement at 'The Iron Gates' at Turnu Severin. The location was a narrow gorge which if blocked would seriously hamper the supply of oil to Germany. However, the raid was a fiasco as within two hundred miles they were captured, eventually deported and thence escorted to Istanbul and Alexandria, courtesy of the Italian Air Force.  

Ian Fleming (James Bond author), then working in Section 17 of the Naval Intelligence Division (NID) had been working closely on this raid together with the British Vice Consul in Bucharest and it is thought contributed to the failure.

In his report to The Admiralty of 22 November 1940, Admiral Cunningham states the following:

'The organisation of these illegal expeditions is much hampered by the difficulty obtaining satisfactory bogus passports and the lack of experts in forgery. Similarly, when forged bills of landing were required, these had to be produced in a very amateur way by two officers of my staff who had, I believe, no previous experience in this act. It is not yet known whether any leakage of information was at the root of the search of the lighter at Giurgiu, which led to the discovery and confiscation of the arms and explosives.'

After several months on the 'Danube Shell' as an engineer, defueling the Vichy French warships in Alexandria harbour and doing odd jobs supplying the besieged North African ports with fuel and water, he returned to HMS Osiris on patrols as a Chief Stoker.

No. 50 Commando 
In October, Warren was signalled to report to Admiral Cunningham C in C on HMS Warspite and as it was assumed that he was still on Special Service, he was invited to volunteer as one of three Naval Liaisons to 50th Middle East Commando based at Heraklion, raiding islands in the Dodecanese. He duly joined No. 50 Commando in November 1941.

'Operation Abstention' was the name given to the invasion of the tiny Greek island of Kastelorizo, the most easterly island of the Dodecanese group being close to the mainland of Turkey. In late February 1941 it was occupied by a small detachment of Italian soldiers. Admiral Cunningham's plan was to capture the island and use it as a base to counter Italian naval and air activities in the region, the latter in particular had been disturbing Allied shipping between Greece and Egypt.

The landing force involved 200 commandos aboard the destroyers HMS Decoy and Hereward and a 24-man detachment of Royal Marines on board HMS Ladybird. The primary objective was to establish a beachhead and hold it for twenty four hours prior to the landing of a Company of Sherwood Foresters, arriving from Cyprus. HMS Ladybird was only at Kastelorizzo for a short time, however she had a tough time of it and was pursued most of the way back to Cyprus, having done a most useful job firing 12x6" shells into Paleocastro Fort. She was hit and had about a dozen casualties, some serious.

Warren and his two naval comrades landed after the main party but mistakenly on a different beach, thereafter taking a small track towards the town where they came across several dead Italians and Allied wounded.

He wrote: 'There was a hell of a racket going on inland and we were told to keep a look out for the Navy as the commandos were to be relieved by troops from Cyprus. Sometime in the afternoon we found a small bar in a beautiful little harbour and sat there for a while when suddenly one of our destroyers came around the headland, we moved inland and found ourselves behind some of our commandos who later opened fire on our own men, such was the confusion.

An Italian Motor Torpedo Boat appeared beneath us looking for a target, spotted us as we made for the shelter of some rocks and fired, we didn't return fire although had we had a Bren gun I believe we could have put paid to her as she was pretty close in. She called out on her loud hailer, in good English, for us to surrender. Later that night, tired and thirsty we saw the shadow of a destroyer, thinking it might be one of ours we flashed it and back came the reply, 'Hero', never was a ship more aptly named! We made up a rope with rifle slings and belts and got down to the beach where we were told about the wounded who had been removed to a school. We went to take a look, surprisingly it was behind enemy lines. Most of the wounded could walk, I managed one very heavy soldier on my back but not for long without help and when we reached the beach the Coxswain of one of Hero's whalers came ashore to assist'.

The entire operation was a shambles, the Italian garrison had managed to message the main Italian base at Rhodes for reinforcements and soon bombers were targeting the Allies whilst Italian troops were landing. Our troops that had landed were hastily re embarked although forty commandos were left behind and captured. Admiral Cunningham, commenting on the operation, described it as 'A rotten business and reflected little credit to everyone.'

Returning once more to Crete in March 1941, Warren was holed up in Suda Bay, having been left to find his own way home and in danger of becoming stranded by the German invasion in May of that year.  He had settled in a very old school house on a promontory overlooking the bay from the west landward side, with a borrowed uniform a pig and a donkey. However, when HMS York was hit and damaged by an Italian explosive motor boat, he noticed his old submarine HMS Rover entering Suda Bay to give her power. In doing so Rover was hit by the Luftwaffe's bombing of the stricken York and badly affected so that she could neither use her engines or motors.

Having met up with Lt Commander Greenway, Rover's skipper and familiar with him from their days together in China, Warren volunteered as Chief Stoker. What he hadn't found out was that Rover was no longer a submarine and could not dive! Greenway had arranged for Rover to be towed on the surface to Alexandria by the destroyer, HMS Griffin, a risky venture as Griffin had orders to cut Rover and her twelve-man crew loose in the event of the enemy being sighted. All day on 30 and 31 May the crew zig zagged behind Griffin, using hand steering which was exhausting. Eventually, on 2 May Griffin and Rover arrived alongside HMS Medway to a hero's welcome.

Rover was eventually patched up and Warren sailed with her, again on the surface, to Singapore where she was refitted although she never took any active part in the remainder of the war. Warren was permitted leave after two and a half years of war, he sailed home on a Dutch liner and that same evening met up with his long time girlfriend Aileen Ivey, at her father's house, 'Windrush' in Bickley. It was 7 March and they were both feeling impatient so the next day they obtained a licence and arranged the wedding for 12 March 1942 at St George's Hanover Square. The following afternoon he went home to Bedford and informed his parents, arranging for his youngest brother Michael, to be best man. The wedding was photographed and featured in the Evening Standard.

Returning from honeymoon in Chipping Norton, his month's leave over, Warren reported to Fort Blockhouse in Portsmouth. The city looked as if it had suffered a major earthquake but Blockhouse was miraculously untouched.

As a Stoker Petty Officer with over eleven years' service it seemed a certainty that Warren would be recalled to General Service and forced to leave submarines, so he resolved to do everything possible to prevent a move.

Crossing the parade ground the next day his old CO Commander Sladen approached him and after a brief chat invited Warren to meet him later at the 'Tank', the hundred feet deep training tower for submarine escape rehearsals. On arrival at the 'Tank', he realised he knew all the Escape Coxswains and also the Escape Officer, Lieutenant Commander W. Shelford.

When Warren mentioned that he had been sent by Sladen there was a certain amount of whispering and then he stripped off, did the drill and put on breathing equipment and some blacked out goggles. Several nuts and bolts were thrown in which Warren was required to find and marry together which he did successfully. After lunch he met again with Sladen and was ordered to meet at the 'Tank' at nine the following day.

'I had no idea what he had planned for me, maybe some crackpot mission, blocking a harbour with a sinking boat and the skeleton crew having to escape as Lieutenant Sandford had done at Zebrugge in the First World War. He had won a VC for his actions but if that was required of me, I wouldn't be too happy leaving a lovely widow. I spent the afternoon sorting out my marriage allowance and allotting it to Aileen and I called her that evening telling her that something was up, but I had no idea what.

The next morning, I arrived at the 'Tank' with several others but no submariners. We performed various stunts and tasks in the Tank and the escape chambers although I just couldn't imagine where I fitted in with the others. We were told that we would spend the next couple of days there and I deliberately waited behind until I was alone with Sladen who intimated that he would give me the choice of a return to submarines or I could stick with him. I asked him what were the chances of 'going foreign' and he told me that for a year I would remain at home and then potentially some short bursts of foreign service. I agreed to stay with him and then enjoyed a wonderful four days leave with Aileen, meeting up with her friends and family and her brother Leslie Ivey, a Spitfire pilot.

I returned to the Tank where Sladen was present with other servicemen and he informed us that we were the first class of volunteers for Human Torpedoes, but we were to refer to ourselves as Charioteers as the machines were to be known as Chariots. Secrecy was essential.

Sladen pulled me aside and told me that he wanted me to carry out the initial trials and work with Commander 'Tiny' Fell. Commander W.R.Fell DSC was a legend of the Submarine Service, the longest serving active officer and a calm and patient instructor.

As the newspaper photograph of my 'posh' wedding had been posted in the Mess, I was instantly known as 'the Society Stoker', a contradiction of terms if ever there was!

Fell explained to me that as by far the most experienced of the volunteers the others would be looking to me for guidance and help and he instructed me to report back any signs of hesitation or distress that I perceived, he stressed that the Chariots would be daunting, especially at night and the crews might need all the support they could get.

There were all sorts of issues with the project, apart from the inexperience of the party. How long could we survive underwater whilst riding, the range of the Chariots and a suit would need to be specifically designed to protect us from the cold as well as breathing apparatus to enable an extended time underwater.

The current Standard Submarine Escape set, The D.S.E.A. was accepted as the basic model and by adding another oxygen cylinder we could achieve an extra thirty minutes. Some of us quickly learned that in adjusting our incoming supply of oxygen and using it all up, we prevented excess from escaping and forming surface bubbles which would have given away our position. To this end we all had to spend half an hour at the bottom of the tank without a bubble surfacing, which rapidly became a competition at which the Canadians were excellent. My inbuilt hostility against soldiers was challenged by their courage and attitude, one had a D.S.C and another a Military Medal at Dunkirk.

Meanwhile, I was granted a couple of days leave, to find  suitable digs for Aileen, away from the danger of bombing and we settled on a lovely cottage in Bulldog Row, alongside the pub at Birdham near Chichester.

I soon mastered the breathing apparatus, I wasn't the best but the half-hour session wasn't a problem for me. We then had two visits to the firm of Siebe Gorman at Tolworth, world famous diving engineers and manufacturers of underwater equipment, where they had 'made', or rather put together, a lightweight suit incorporating a helmet of strong material which you pulled over you head with a built in visor and mouthpiece. The actual chariot was not too complicated as we had captured one from the daring Italian raid in Alexandria Harbour.

I recall that at the time I was not too happy with my situation, I had volunteered on two previous occasions which had both turned out disastrously. As I imagined that the likely scenario of any operational raid would mean ending up behind wire in a POW camp, the whole thing seemed incredibly risky. However, the pay was good, much better than in submarines and at least for the meantime I could spend any time off with Aileen so I determined to make the best of things and really focus on mastering survival techniques.

Whilst we were waiting impatiently for an actual Chariot, I was detailed to attend the Haslar Experimental Establishment with Sladen and Fell. On arrival we went straight to the tank which was more like a lake and on average twelve feet deep. The two Commanders put on their diving suits and then from behind a screen appeared our 'Chariot', a large wooden torpedo shaped log with two rough seats, metal box and a rudder, it looked like nothing on earth! Sladen and Fell donned their breathing apparatus, lowered the thing into the water and went under, attached to the overhead gantry. The 'Thing' moved up and down like a porpoise and as I was mentally thinking 'Goodbye' to my lovely wife, Fell got off and thrusting his gear at me, told me to jump on. Fortunately, after a short spell, Sladen ran out of oxygen and so we called it a day.

The next morning, we all went to Horsea Lake and by this time the 'Thing' had been christened 'Cassidy', no idea why though! Lieutenant 'Chuck' Bonnel, one of the Canadians in our group and myself, were told to get on and as I was about to take the front seat, Sladen pointed to the back one and explained that because I was well versed in the diving and surfacing of a submarine, he wanted me to take note and report back.

As we were being towed by the dinghy, I could see the planes were hard at dive although nothing was happening, Chuck had been carrying out the drill but to no avail. Back on shore I suggested to Sladen that Cassidy was too light, we should sink it and see.

We found some rocks, went out again into the middle of the lake and we shot down to the bottom and remained, even as I blew the ballast tank. I removed some rocks, blew the ballast tank once more, took off another rock and we surfaced! Once alongside, I thought I'd show off and I vented the ballast tank, sank to the bottom and resurfaced. I was making a point to both Commanders in so much that I knew perfectly well they had erred by trimming Cassidy in fresh water which is obvious less dense than the sea! The rocks were weighed and by the next day we had equivalent lead slabs nailed on.

From that day on I always drove her with others in turn behind me and I managed to always arrange my runs in the forenoon which enabled me to be home in the afternoons with Aileen.

As the mock up was named Cassidy, the first actual mechanical machine was called 'The Real One' and it arrived in great secrecy early June but sadly not before tragedy had struck. A young RNVR Lieutenant had become separated from his lifeline and wasn't found until the regular divers joined the search in the evening. We were all saddened and shaken to realise that one could so easily drown in just thirty feet of water.

The 'Real One' was assembled, it had an electric motor for propulsion and an electric pump for the two trimming tanks, a huge improvement on Cassidy and I was thrilled when Sladen told me to dress up. He took the controls and we set off, trimmed her and then dived, resting on the bottom while the trim was readjusted to a slightly positive setting.

In the meantime, two classes of volunteers had gone North to join Tiny Fell on HMS Titania, a terrible vessel used as a submarine parent ship. Sladen informed me that there were important trials required and if I had any objection to Sub Lieutenant Pat Grant joining me as my Number Two, as the chap behind came to be known. I liked Pat, he was young, and quiet but suitably resolute and he seemed to have no problem being under the instructions of a Stoker Petty Officer! We got on very well and spent as much time as possible understanding and controlling our machine.

Shortly afterwards, an announcement came out of the blue, that Flag Officer Submarines and Admiral King, US Navy, would be down the following morning to witness a demonstration. This meant rushing the afternoon's programme and the two of us were hard put to master the machine's idiosyncrasies as well as rehearse.

After several drills, Sladen ordered the machine to be driven to the end of the lake and the battery charged but as we neared the jetty, I turned to look for the following dinghy and in doing so knocked open my oxygen bypass, as a result I took the full pressure into my lungs and was immediately unconscious. Luckily, Jack Passey quickly held me above the water, released the pressure and opened my visor and I came round.

The following day, screens were erected around the top of the lake and as we had plenty of time to spare, I suggested to Sladen that we went out into the lake to do a trim dive, the first thing a submarine would do before starting a patrol. We bottomed in the deepest water, kept her down and then surfaced and went alongside to wait for the top brass.

On the dot of eleven, the inspecting party arrived. I had never met Sir Max Horton, his exploits in World War One were legend in the Submarine Service but I didn't warm to the surly and totally miserable American Admiral.

We sat astride and set off, diving almost immediately and heading for the centre of the lake spending ten minutes underwater whilst we progressed to one end and then started back. At one stage I kept the machine under for a good ten minutes where we just waited, hopefully creating some anxiety amongst the onlookers before surfacing and disembarked. Sladen was impressed as was Sir Max, who came over and congratulated us.

Having had a private chat with Slade, Sir Max beckoned me over and told me that he knew I hadn't exactly had the best of luck in the Navy and asked if I had any requests, to which I responded, that I should like a commission.

"What as?” he replied sharply. I replied that I should like a transfer to the Royal Naval Volunteer Reserve.

"Well how long until you’ve completed your twelve years?”

Just one year, I told him.

He asked Sladen to make a note on my papers that if he was still in charge in one year's time, I shall see that my recommendation is passed on. He stuck out his hand which I shook.

As Sir Max and the American departed, Sladen thanked me again for the demonstration and told me that when we disappeared underwater, the top brass were anxiously checking their watches and on the point of ordering a rescue! He told Grant and I that he needed to hang on to us for some more training sessions before sending us North to join Commander Fell and the rest of the party on Titania.

I told Aileen the bad news that I would be heading North and asked her to contact the agent, we had loved our time at Bulldog Row, our first home together but it would soon be time to leave.

On 16 April 1943, a party was selected to proceed to Malta to be accommodated on Manoel Island and the machines were delivered for practice runs in Ghain-Tuffihea Bay.

The invasion of Sicily was the next plan in the Allied offensive and subsequently a detailed and reliable reconnaissance of the proposed landing beaches was a high priority. Initial visits had been made by canoeists but it was decided that Chariots would be better suited for further work and the first successful reconnaissance was made on 31 May, operating from the submarine HMS Unseen. The Chariot was carried by Unseen and released three miles from the shore and then led to within half a mile by a collapsible canoe. On nearing the beach they dived to within fifteen feet and proceeded inshore until the machine struck bottom. The operator then dismounted and still attached to the craft by a wire, walked until his head broke the surface and he could take a good look around.

By the second week in June there were no further trips so plans were made to find other jobs for the men whence highly trained divers were found mundane tasks. Petty Officers Smith and Warren were fortunate in being posted to the Island's diving tank to train and instruct submarine crews in escape methods.

As soon as the invasion of Sicily had commenced, frequent and urgent demands began pouring in for shallow water divers to clear the propellers of landing craft and perform similar duties. From this requirement was created the Mobile Diving Unit, to consist Smith, Warren, Petty officer Kirby and Chief Petty Officer 'Ginger' Warr. The transport by which the 'mobility' was ensured was an ancient Hillman Minx, acquired by dubious means and a powerful motorbike. Most of the diving was undertaken half naked in the most appalling conditions, amongst bilge oil and other filth and often meant crawling underneath a Landing Craft in the middle of the night to see if a 'small length of heaving line' could be cleared, only to find out that what was actually around the propeller was a four and a half-inch wire hawser!

Whilst all this was happening on a night on, night off basis, Kirby and Warren came up with an plan to return to charioteering. They suggested that some useful purpose could be achieved by using the machines as underwater minelayers. Details were checked with the authorities and it was discovered that one Chariot with only a single rider, could easily manage four mines. The charioteers had their eyes on the Corinth Canal as the first area of operation where they could drop eight mines and then walk back to a rendezvous. Semi official preparations were put in hand and the scheme duly submitted and sent home for final approval but ultimately rejected. Warren was disappointed and thought the special operation no more daft than the two mad schemes he had already undertaken!

Italy surrendered in September 1943 and operations from Malta came to an end. Warren had now completed his twelve-year term and was signalled to return home to the UK whereupon he was informed that Admiral Sir Max Horton had kept his promise and he was to attend HMS King Alfred in Hove, the shore establishment for training officers from The RNVR (Royal Naval Volunteer Reserve). After a three-month course, Warren was commissioned as a Temporary Acting Sub Lieutenant, being the only ex Stoker to pass through as an Executive Branch Officer. After completion of the course, he attended the Royal Naval College at Greenwich before operational posting.

During Spring and Summer of 1944, some of the charioteers transferred to other branches of the Service, others continued training and working up, sharing Bonaventure (a merchant ship converted for use as a submarine depot vessel) on Loch Striven and HHZ ( Loch Cairnbawn) with the X- craft crews (Midget Submarines).

It was thus that Sub Lieutenant Warren and Midshipman Jimmy Benson travelled north together on the same train and struck up conversation and a subsequent close friendship. Benson was reporting for spare crew X-craft duties.

The Chariots housed in Bonaventure were chiefly the new Mark 2's on which Numbers One and Two sat back to back with their legs inside the structure of the machine. During the Summer there were two Chariot accidents, both within shouting distance of Bonavanture's Quarter- Deck. The second of these was fatal.

Two days earlier had come the first accident. Warren was taking down one of the few Mark 1 machines for a trial dive and whilst everything has seemed to be in order, no sooner had they dived but the hydroplane controls became stuck at 'Hard to dive'. At sixty feet, Warren gave up wrestling with the joystick and turned to see whether his Number Two, Leading Stoker Harman, wanted to bail out. As he did so, his elbow knocked the by-pass valve full open at 2200 pounds per square inch. Instinctively he spat out his mouthpiece but in doing so let the pressure flood into his suit. He immediately became the perfect imitation of the Michelin Man, with his arms forced outwards. Harman acted instantly and in a flash had cut open one of Warren's cuffs to allow the pressure to escape and he made his way up with Warren and the Chariot from what was probably ninety to a hundred feet depth. After several weeks in hospital nursing a distended lung, Warren was pronounced fit for diving but not for charioteering and so left the Flotilla.

He was appointed Trials Officer with the Admiralty Experimental Diving Unit (AEDU) and sent to the shore based HMS Vernon at Brixham in Devon, together with Aileen, where the vast majority of training involved port clearances in preparation for the invasion of Europe. In the 1945 New Years Honours List he was awarded the M.B.E. (3 July 1945)

In 1946 he was posted to Kiel to review the German Underwater School on the island of Sylte where the German vessel Walter Holzapfel was taken over to be converted at HMS Deepwater, the Royal Navy diving ship. He carried out various salvage jobs and further training of the deep sea divers.

He was duly promoted Lieutenant and compulsorily de mobbed in December 1946. On receipt of his first quarterly pension he saw that he had been transferred from The Royal Naval Volunteer Reserve to the Royal Navy, objective achieved!

Later life 
Lieutenant Jim Warren was invested as a Member of the Order of the British Empire in 1945. He died in Kent on 24 May 1988, aged 76.

The Twelfth Flotilla Association 
After the war, Warren helped found The Twelfth Flotilla Association, he was the Honorary Secretary and became a tireless publicist for the Flotilla members and those from the Submarine Service. He was not afraid to reprimand his former C in C, Admiral of the Fleet Viscount Cunningham of Hyndhope, in a letter to the Daily Telegraph for having done less than justice in his memoirs to the Flotilla's achievements.

Television 
During the Fifties and Sixties Warren often appeared on television and in the press as an expert on submarine warfare and escape.

Publications
Warren and Jimmy Benson set about writing the history of the Flotilla and produced 'Above Us The Waves', published in 1953 and still in print to this day, having sold over a million copies. In 1958 a film was produced starring many of the leading British actors.

Their second book, 'The Admiralty Regrets' published in 1958, concerned the tragic sinking of HMS Thetis, off Holyhead during sea trials in June 1939 with the loss of ninety-nine lives. They received no assistance from the Admiralty as the authors were largely critical of the pathetic rescue efforts.

'Will Not We Fear' published in 1961 was their third publication which told the story of HMS Seal, the only British submarine to surrender in World War Two during 1940.

Their fourth and final book 'The Broken Column' published in 1966 which recounted the extraordinary exploits of a British submariner who joined and led an Italian partisan group.

Film adaptations

The 1955 British war film Above Us the Waves, starring John Mills, John Gregson and Donald Sinden, was based on Jim Warren's 1953 book of the same name.

Biography
Born in Croydon on 11 January 1912, "Jim" Warren was educated at Bedford School. In 1931 he became the first ex-public schoolboy to join the Royal Navy as an ordinary stoker. He hoped to achieve a commission through the Selborne-Fisher scheme. He achieved extremely high marks in both the theoretical and practical examinations, but the engineer commander at the Leading Stokers School in Chatham Dockyard refused to grant him a commission. Instead he was offered a free choice of whichever ship he wanted and chose submarines. Between 1934 and 1936 he served aboard HMS Rover on the China Station, and then aboard HMS Otus and HMS Osiris. He served during the Second World War and, in 1940, he took part in an operation intended to block the Danube at the Iron Gates, on the border between Serbia and Romania, to prevent German access to oil from the Ploiești oil fields. The plan was discovered and aborted.

Warren then became a member of the naval liaison staff attached to No. 50 Commando based at Heraklion on Crete, raiding enemy outposts in the Dodecanese. During the evacuation of Greece, in 1941, he was Chief Stoker aboard the damaged HMS Rover as she was towed by the destroyer HMS Griffin to Alexandria. In 1942, he volunteered for the Special Submarine Flotilla, later known as the 12th Submarine Flotilla, which used two-man human torpedoes, chariots and midget submarines, to attack enemy targets, including the German battleship Tirpitz.

In 1943, Warren carried out the beach surveys of Sicily before the Allied landings and, in 1944, he was finally commissioned as a Sub-Lieutenant, but was seriously injured when he lost control of a chariot and sank to a depth of 100 feet. In 1946 he was commissioned as a Lieutenant and retired from the Royal Navy.

References

External links
 
 

1912 births
1988 deaths
People educated at Bedford School
Royal Navy personnel of World War II
Royal Navy submariners
Members of the Order of the British Empire
British writers